Al Abr District is a district of the Hadhramaut Governorate, Yemen. As of 2003, the district had a population of 3348 inhabitants.

References

Districts of Hadhramaut Governorate